KMCI may refer to:
 KMCI-TV, a television station (channel 25, virtual 38) licensed to serve Lawrence, Kansas, United States
 The ICAO code for Kansas City International Airport in Kansas City, Missouri
 Kettle Moraine Correctional Institution, a medium-security prison in rural Plymouth, Wisconsin